Manikbhandar is a locality in Nizamabad city of  Telangana state, India.
It used to be a village in the Nizamabad district before the extension of Municipal Corporation limits and now it comes under the jurisdiction of Nizamabad Municipal Corporation. However the locality is administrated by Sarpanch who is elected representative of village.

Nearby Places
 Vijay Rural Engineering College 
 Kakatiya Institute of Technology for Women (KITW) are located at Manikbhandar.

References

Nizamabad, Telangana
Cities and towns in Nizamabad district